Mayra Aguiar da Silva (born August 3 1991) is a Brazilian judoka. She was a bronze medallist in three consecutive Olympics, 2012, 2016 and 2020. She is also three-time world champion (2014, 2017, 2022). She is the first Brazilian woman to win three Olympic medals in an individual sport.

Bio
Mayra was born in Porto Alegre and began judo training when she was young.

She trains under Kiko (Antônio Carlos Pereira) in a group with João Derly, Tiago Camilo and others in SOGIPA. Derly and Camilo are also her sporting idols.

In December 2008, she suffered a serious injury to her right knee. She was unable to perform any judo training for almost ten months, coming back only in September 2009.

Judo
She is one of the most talented Brazilian judokas in history. When she was 16 years old, she competed at 2007 Pan American Games and won a silver medal.

In 2008, she competed at Olympic Games in Beijing but lost her only match with Spanish judoka Leire Iglesias.

In 2009, she missed the whole season because of a knee injury.

In 2010, after an injury, Mayra changed category from middleweight to half-heavyweight and won a gold medal at 2010 Pan American Judo Championships in El Salvador. In September of that same year, she participated at the 2010 World Judo Championships and lost the final to Kayla Harrison from the United States, receiving the silver medal.

In 2012, Aguiar won the bronze medal at the 2012 Summer Olympics, winning three matches by ippon. Her only defeat was again to Harrison, who won the semifinal on the way to a gold medal.

Aguiar became the world champion in 2014, defeating the French Audrey Tcheuméo in the final.

With Brazil hosting the 2016 Summer Olympics and Aguiar's recent triumphs, she was the favorite to win the gold. A difficult semifinal against Tcheuméo, where Aguiar was kept scoreless and was defeated on penalties, sent her again to the bronze match, which Aguiar won, giving her a second Olympic medal.

In 2021, she won one of the bronze medals in the women's 78 kg event at the 2020 Summer Olympics in Tokyo, Japan.

Achievements

References

External links

 Official website (archived)
 

1991 births
Living people
Judoka at the 2008 Summer Olympics
Judoka at the 2012 Summer Olympics
Judoka at the 2016 Summer Olympics
Olympic bronze medalists for Brazil
Olympic medalists in judo
Judoka at the 2007 Pan American Games
Olympic judoka of Brazil
Medalists at the 2012 Summer Olympics
Medalists at the 2016 Summer Olympics
Medalists at the 2020 Summer Olympics
Brazilian female judoka
Pan American Games silver medalists for Brazil
Pan American Games bronze medalists for Brazil
Pan American Games medalists in judo
Judoka at the 2015 Pan American Games
Judoka at the 2019 Pan American Games
World judo champions
Medalists at the 2007 Pan American Games
Medalists at the 2015 Pan American Games
Medalists at the 2019 Pan American Games
Judoka at the 2020 Summer Olympics
Sportspeople from Porto Alegre
21st-century Brazilian women